The Troy Trojans baseball team is the varsity intercollegiate baseball team of Troy University, located in Troy, Alabama, United States. It competes in the NCAA Division I Sun Belt Conference. The program began play in 1911. In 1986 and 1987, Troy won Division II national championships under head coach Chase Riddle. As a Division II program, the team won 10 conference titles and appeared in 14 NCAA Regionals and 7 College World Series.

As of the end of the 2020 season, the program's overall record is 1,774–1,114–3. Troy is the 36th all-time winningest baseball program among all Division 1 programs.

History

Early history
Few schools in the South, especially in the state of Alabama, possess as rich a history as that of the Troy baseball program. In the past 40 years alone, Trojan baseball squads have claimed more than 1,300 victories, 14 conference championships, 7 NCAA Regional crowns, and back-to-back Division II NCAA National Championships in 1986 and 1987.

As early as the turn of the 20th century, old photographs show evidence that Troy fielded an intercollegiate baseball team in the early 1900s, but school records only date back to 1931. In the teams early years, they were known as the "Teachers" since the college was primarily an educational institution for teachers.  In 1931, the Troy Normal School moved all home games to what is now known as Riddle-Pace Field. The previous playing field, which was located on the quad in front of Shackelford Hall, was the original playing field.  This relocation occurred because of baseballs breaking the windows of Shackelford Hall.

Chase Riddle era
In 1979, Troy State hired Chase Riddle, who was a manager and scout for the St. Louis Cardinals major league baseball team.  In his first year as the head coach, he led the Trojans to a then-school-record 33 wins and a second place finish in the Gulf South Conference Eastern Division.  That same season, Troy performed a two-game sweep of the Alabama Crimson Tide; a big accomplishment for an in-state Division II school.

In Riddle's second season at the helm, he went on to accomplish even more. His 1980 team finished the season 30–12, garnering a significant win over the then #7-ranked Florida State Seminoles by a score of 5–3. The Trojans would wind up winning the Gulf South Conference championship and the NCAA Central Regional, and making it all the way to the NCAA College World Series.  They were eliminated with a 1–2 record from the World Series, but Troy had established themselves as a new powerhouse baseball program.

The 1981 and 1982 seasons were also huge successes for Riddle and his program. The program won another Gulf South Conference championship in 1981 with yet another appearance in the College World Series, finishing the season with a 37–10 record. The 1982 season would be nearly a copy of the previous season, with Troy winning yet another conference championship and making it to the College World Series yet again. Troy would also garner big wins against Auburn and Clemson that same year.

From 1983 to 1985, the Trojans would go 105–42, making three NCAA Regional appearances and two College World Series appearances.

In 1986, the Trojans defeated Columbus State, 5–0, to win their first NCAA College World Series (Division II). They finished the season as the #1-ranked team in the country, with a 46–8 overall record, and a 12–0 conference record to win another Gulf South Conference title. In 1987, they followed up with yet another national championship by defeating Tampa, 7–5.  For his successes, head coach Chase Riddle was named National Head Coach of the Year by the American Baseball Coaches Association in 1986 and 1987.

Chase Riddle would wind up retiring in 1990, finishing his notable career with a record of 434–149–2. Less than one year after his retirement, Riddle's #25 jersey that he wore was retired. Riddle was inducted into the Alabama Sports Hall of Fame in 2000, the Wiregrass Sports Hall of Fame in 2005, and later into the Troy Sports Hall of Fame in 2012.

John Mayotte era
Upon transitioning from Division II to Division I, the Trojans finished their tenure in Division II with a 38–25 overall record against competition in NCAA postseason play.

In the Trojan's last season of play in Division II, coach John Mayotte helped continue the trend of Trojan baseball success, leading the team to another College World Series appearance, only to be eliminated with a 2–2 record. The Trojans finished that season ranked #3 in the nation.

After coach Mayotte helped lead Troy into their new era of Division I baseball, he led the team to their first Division I NCAA Regional in 1995, just Troy's second season of being in Division I. Troy was eliminated in the Regional by Florida State and Ole Miss that season. In 1997, Mayotte once again led Troy to another NCAA Regional, where Troy was again eliminated, this time by Alabama and Southern California.

Bobby Pierce era
In 2003, Troy hired Bobby Pierce as head coach. In his 4th season (2006), he led Troy to their 3rd ever appearance in an NCAA Regional. In what would become one of Pierce's best seasons, his Trojans went 47–16 and won their first Sun Belt Conference championship. They entered into the Tuscaloosa Regional as the #2-seed team, while also holding a national ranking of #27 by the National Collegiate Baseball Writers Association.  Troy would face #3-seed Southern Miss in the first matchup, with Troy scoring their first victory in a Regional since joining Division I, beating Southern Miss by a score of 10–8. Troy would fall to #1-seed Alabama in the next round, only to face Southern Miss and beating them yet again. Troy would finally be eliminated from the Regional by Alabama in the final game. Three players from the 2006 team were taken that year in the MLB Draft: Tom King, Mike Felix, and Jarred Keel.

The Trojans went on to have a lot of success over the years since that 2006 season, finding themselves ranked in the Top 25 occasionally almost every season, yet never finishing with a national ranking. That trend would change in 2013.

The 2013 season saw Troy have one of its strongest batting lineups in the program's history. The Trojans were in the Top 10 in the NCAA in total home runs, hitting 54 that season.  After getting big wins over Texas Tech and Auburn during the season, the Trojans won another Sun Belt Conference championship, going 40–18 during the regular season. Troy would be ranked #26 by Collegiate Baseball going into the Tallahassee Regional, garnering them the #3-seed. They would face Alabama in the first round, defeating the Crimson Tide 5–2, only to lose to Florida State in the next round. After being put into the elimination bracket, Troy had to once again face the Alabama Crimson Tide. The Trojans would defeat the Tide yet again, this time in a thriller by a score of 9–8. Troy faced Florida State in the finals of the Regional, but wound up being eliminated by the Seminoles, 4–11.

The Trojans would finish the 2013 season with their first ever Top 25 rankings, being ranked #23 by Collegiate Baseball and #25 by Baseball America.

Bobby Pierce finished his career with a 450–313 record at Troy, leading the program to their first Top 25 finish and 4 NCAA Regional appearances. For his accomplishments, Pierce was inducted into the Alabama Baseball Coaches Hall of Fame in 2010, the Wiregrass Hall of Fame in 2017, and the Troy Sports Hall of Fame in 2018.

Mark Smartt era
After the 2016 season, long-time assistant coach Mark Smartt was hired as Troy's new head coach. Smartt is a Troy University alumnus and was a member of the Troy State Trojans baseball teams that was Division II national championships in 1986 and 1987.

In Smartt's second season at the helm, his team would go 31–25, performing a rare accomplishment by defeating every in-state on the schedule in 2017. The Trojans would defeat Alabama, Auburn, UAB, South Alabama, Alabama State, Samford, and Jacksonville State that season.

In 2018, in just Smartt's third season as head coach, he led Troy to a 2nd-place finish in the Sun Belt Conference and finished with a 42–21 record that season. The team would make it all the way to the Sun Belt Conference Tournament finals against #19 Coastal Carolina, only to lose 6–11 to the Chanticleers. Troy wound up receiving an at-large bid to the NCAA Tournament, where they would face #18 Duke in the first round, defeating the Blue Devils by a score of 6–0. The Trojans' fortunes would fade from there though, losing to #9 Georgia in the next round, and finally being eliminated in a re-match with Duke. Troy finished the season with the sixth-most wins in school history, while garnering a few wins over Top 25 ranked teams, including #17 Coastal Carolina, #18 Duke, and #22 Auburn.

Coaches

Riddle-Pace Field

Riddle-Pace Field, located on the university's campus, is the program's home venue.  It is named for Chase Riddle, former head coach of the program, and Matthew Downer Pace, who served Troy University from 1891 to 1941 as Professor of Mathematics, Dean, and President.

The stadium features a brick concourse, a three-story press box, restrooms, a concession stand, and a merchandise booth.  The stadium has a capacity of 2,000 spectators, which includes 1,700 bleacher seats and 300 chair-back seats.  More spectator areas are located beyond the left field fence and adjacent to the home plate dugout.  The Lott Baseball Complex was built along the left field fence, which houses coaches offices, player locker rooms and lounge, and an indoor batting cage.

The field had its grass turf removed and was replaced with artificial grass turf in 2008.  Troy was one of only three college baseball programs at the time to switch from grass fields to artificial turf.  A state-of-the-art drainage system was installed with the new artificial turf, lending the Troy baseball team the ability to play games in a very short amount of time after heavy rains come through.

The field has become known for its "Monster" wall in right field, a 27-foot tall black wall with a built-in scoreboard and video board.  It's currently one of the largest outfield walls in all of college baseball.

Attendance

Attendance Rankings

Troy has been ranked in the NCAA's Top 50 for annual average home attendance for multiple seasons since the early 2000s.

Attendance Records
Below is a list of Troy's top six single-game attendance figures.

All-Americans
Troy has produced 58 All-American players, as well as 6 Academic All-Americans.  Since Troy joined the NCAA's Division I in 1994, the program has had 16 players named as All-Americans.

The following is a list of all First Team All-Americans Troy has had since joining Division I:

Award Winners/Finalists
ABCA National Coach of the Year
Chase Riddle – 1986, 1987
John Mayotte – 1993Rawlings Gold Glove AwardBrett Henry – 2009
Brandon Lockridge – 2018Brooks Wallace Award FinalistAdam Bryant – 2010
Tyler Vaughn – 2013

MLB Draft
Troy has had 59''' total players selected in the MLB Draft in its history.  Click the "show" button at the top corner of the table below in order to see the list of Trojans that have been drafted.

Notable alumni

The following players made their way onto Major League rosters from either being drafted or signed as free agents:

Clint Robinson
Chase Whitley
Fred "Scrap Iron" Hatfield
Mackey Sasser
Danny Cox
TJ Rivera
Mike Rivera
Tom Drake
Danny Breeden
Mike Pérez
Ray Stephens
Tom Gregorio
Grady Wilson

Championships

Since Troy's first year in Division I in 1994, the program has won six regular-season conference titles and three conference tournament titles.

In the team's short stint in the Mid-Continent Conference, they won the regular season title in three straight seasons, from 1995 to 1997, to go along with two tournament titles in 1995 and 1997.  In Troy's last season in the Atlantic Sun Conference in 2005, they won the regular season title.  Since joining the Sun Belt Conference, the team has won three regular season titles in 2006, 2011, and 2013.  Troy also won the SBC tournament title in 2006.

The program has compiled a total of 20 conference championships and two D-II national championships since its inception.

Conference Season Championships

Conference Tournament Championships

Division II national championships
In 1986, the Trojans defeated Columbus State, 5–0, to win the Division II College World Series.  In 1987, they followed up with yet another national championship by defeating Tampa, 7–5.

Then head coach Chase Riddle was named National Head Coach of the Year in 1986 and 1987 for his successes of winning two national championships in a row.

Top 25 finishes

Yearly results

Division I

Postseason results

Division I

NCAA regionals

Division II

NCAA regionals

College World Series

See also
List of NCAA Division I baseball programs

References

External links